BAI–Sicasal–Petro de Luanda is a UCI Continental road cycling team based in Angola. The team was established in 2017. It became UCI registered in late 2018, in preparation for the 2019 season.

Team roster

Major results
2019
Stage 1 Tour du Faso, Team time trial

References

External links

Cycling teams established in 2017
UCI Continental Teams (Africa)
Cycling teams based in Angola